The Battle of Island Flats (also Battle at Long Island of the Holston, Battle of Eaton's Station) was the opening battle of the American War of Independence in the west. The battle was fought in July 1776, and pitted the American regional Patriot militia against the British allied Cherokee forces in the Overmountain region of the American frontier.

War

In mid-July, Dragging Canoe, Oconostota , and The Raven led a surprise attack on the Overmountain settlements of Eaton's station, Fort Watauga, and Carter's Valley, respectively.<ref name= "crsis">Calloway, Colin G.; [https://archive.org/details/americanrevoluti0000call/page/n7/mode/2up?q= "The American Revolution in Indian Country : Crisis and diversity in Native American communities]; Cambridge University Press, (1995); ISBN: 0 521 47149 4; </ref> The purpose of the coordinated, three-pronged attacks were to drive the settlers of the Washington District back over the Appalachian Mountains. The attacks were made with the knowledge that the British allies of the Cherokee would be escalating their war against the American rebels following their recent Declaration of Independence. The Cherokee were going to war.

Eaton's station
Warned ahead of time of the coming assault by messengers sent from Cherokee diplomat Nancy Ward, the areas' militia members, most of whom were battle hardened and experienced from the recent Dunmore's War, were mustered to Eaton's station,National Archives : To George Washington from Piomingo, 30 October 1789 [letter not found; created May, 4, 2002; perma-link; National Archives website; "Founders Online;" Source Project: Washington Papers; retrieved March 9, 2023 situated on the ridge just east of Long Island. Under Majors James Thompson and William Cocke, they readied Eaton's station for battle. Along with a small garrison of soldiers that had been stationed in the area, they rapidly fortified the simple way-station and constructed a stockade fence of logs and rails around it.Lynch, Wayne; William Cocke at the Battle of Long Island Flats, 1776; "Journal of the American Revolution"; [via WebPage; May 7, 2013; All Things Liberty online]; retrieved March 2023 Then the frontiersmen waited for the arrival of the war party.

Battle
Both of the opposing forces comprised less than 200 men each: about 170 for the frontiersmen, and approximately 190 for the Indians. The Native American raiders were following Cherokee war chiefs, Oconostota, Dragging Canoe (Tsiyu Gansini) and The Raven (Savanukah), all of whom were skilled and experienced warriors. They started their campaign against the settlers on July 20, 1776. Because of the lack of surprise that they counted on, the Cherokees were quickly routed, and they withdrew after suffering at least 14 fatalities (nearly one-twelfth of their entire force). The Indians also suffered several lesser casualties—including a badly wounded Dragging Canoe. The station defenders suffered four casualties.

After being beaten back by the frontiersmen, Cherokee raiding parties continued attacks against the isolated settlements in the region. State militias retaliated, destroying Native villages and crops. 

Notes

References

Further reading
Alderman, Pat; Dragging Canoe: Cherokee-Chickamauga War Chief; Overmountain Press; Johnson City, Tennessee; (1978)
Brown, John P;  Old Frontiers; Kingsport: Southern Publishers; (1938)
Haywood, W.H.; The Civil and Political History of the State of Tennessee from its Earliest Settlement up to the Year 1796; Methodist Episcopal Publishing House; Nashville; (1891)
Moore, John Trotwood; Foster, Austin P.; Tennessee, The Volunteer State, 1769-1923, Vol. 1''; S. J. Clarke Publishing Co.; Chicago; (1923)

External links
 Battle of Long Island Flats; Waymarking.com; Roadside Historical Marker; Text & Picture

18th century Cherokee history
1776 in the United States
Tennessee in the American Revolution
Conflicts in 1776
Native American history of Tennessee
18th century in the United States